PT Kereta Api Indonesia (Persero) (English: Indonesian Railways Company, abbreviated as PT KAI or simply KAI) is the sole operator of public railways in Indonesia. It is completely state-owned and pays track access charges to the government. The headquarters of KAI are located in Bandung, West Java.

History

Kereta Api Indonesia is the latest of a long line of successive state railway companies dating from Dutch colonial days. Exactly on 27 August 1864, the first railway company in Indonesia was established by the Dutch colonial government as Nederlandsch-Indische Spoorweg Maatschappij (NIS) with Samarang-Tanggung as its maiden route. The first ground breaking was carried out in Kemijen Village and inaugurated by L.A.J.W. Baron Sloet van de Beele. Another railway company, Staatsspoorwegen was established, and their route stretched from Buitenzorg to Soerabaja. The Dutch colonial government also established Deli Spoorweg Maatschappij in North Sumatra, to transport rubber and tobacco around the Deli area.

Indonesia gained independence in 1945–1953, the separate systems (except the Deli Railway Company) were combined into the Djawatan Kereta Api Republik Indonesia (DKARI, Railways Service of the Republic of Indonesia). Non-state railway systems in Java retained their paper existence until 1958, when all railway lines in Indonesia were nationalised, including the Deli Railway Company, thereby creating the Perusahaan Negara Kereta Api (PNKA, Indonesian National Railways Corporation Ltd.) on 25 May 1963. On 15 September 1971 the name of PNKA was changed to Perusahaan Jawatan Kereta Api (PJKA, the Railway Service Corporation). Later then, on 2 January 1991, PJKA was changed its name and status as Perusahaan Umum Kereta Api (Perumka, the Railways Public Corporation), and as of 1 June 1999 was converted into a joint-stock company as PT Kereta Api (Persero) (PT KA, Indonesian Railways Company JSC). In May 2010, its name was changed into PT Kereta Api Indonesia (Persero) (PT KAI) until the present day. 

In 2019, KAI carried 429 million passengers and 47.2 million tonnes of cargo.

KAI has conducted some export operations with narrow gauge-type trains exported Australia, Malaysia, and Thailand (freight wagons), Bangladesh (passenger wagons) and locomotives and DMUs to the Philippines.

Assets
In order to value assets belong to KAI (not the government), internal revaluation of assets has been done by the Ministry of Transportation. The company owns Rp.35 trillion ($4.1 billion) as land and Rp.22 trillion ($2.6 billion) as other assets (bridges, signals, etc.). The exact value was to be determined by the end of 2011 or 2012, based on an audit by the Ministry of Finance.

Trackage
The company currently operates two types of railways, Cape gauge and standard gauge. The 1,067 mm gauge is most common in Java and all regional divisions of Sumatra, while the railway uses 1,435 mm gauge. Historically, the company had operated 600 mm gauge and 750 mm gauge for some tramway lines.

The present extent of the system is now  as of 2019, with the Aceh system, most of the West Sumatra system and most former steam tram lines abandoned, but including new tracks built alongside old tracks (double tracking projects).

Much of the branch lines constructed in the colonial era have been lifted up or abandoned in the 1980s. No major railway construction has since taken place; however, many of the busiest lines have been double tracked.  of the northern coast area lines of Java was double tracked in May 2014, followed by the completion of a  double tracking project on the south coast by 2015. On 8 June 2015 the Duri-Tangerang double track project was inaugurated for KA Commuter Jabodetabek, but it can be also used for airport trains.

Significant projects being considered include:
 Quadrapling Manggarai-Cikarang line. The project will be divided into 2 segments: Manggarai-Bekasi, 15 kilometres long and scheduled to be finished in 2016 and Bekasi-Cikarang, 17 kilometres long scheduled to be finished in 2017
 Airport line to the Sukarno-Hatta International Airport. A 33 kilometer line from Manggarai, Dukuh Atas in Sudirman, Tanah Abang, Angke, and Pluit and along the airport toll road to the airport. The cost was projected to be US$1.13 billion. Construction began 2012 and originally projected to be completed at 2014; though the completion of the railway had been delayed to 2017, when the train commenced operation.
 Rebuilding of the Aceh railway, with assistance from the French railway company SNCF.
 Building new 15-kilometres-long track between Cibungur and Tanjungrasa station. This shortcut will ensure trains from Bandung to Semarang do not need to go through Cikampek station.

Future expansion plans of the railway will include linking of existing railway lines in Sumatra from Aceh to Lampung via both west and east coasts of the island. Railway lines are also planned to be built on the currently railway-free islands of Kalimantan and Sulawesi.
A Memorandum of Understanding has been signed to build railway around Bali with length of 565 kilometers. Nowadays, the first trackage project of the Trans-Sulawesi Railway with a length of 143 kilometres from Makassar to Pare-pare was initiated with 30 kilometres of land acquisitions, and initial construction began in June 2015, with 70 kilometres built in 2016 and the remaining 43 kilometres built in 2017. The train began service in 2018 with trackage wider than in Java to accommodate more weight and speed. The schedule for Pare-pare to Manado trackage will be completed in 5 years after it.

There are also plans to reactivate non-operational railway lines in West Java, such as the Bandung-Ciwidey line, intended to ease road traffic congestion; and the Rancaekek-Tanjung Sari line. Four other non-operational lines are still in consideration.

The Kedungjati-Tuntang trackage, a part of the Semarang-Ambarawa reactivated trackage, is the only railway in Indonesia without road crossings. It has 8 flyovers and underpasses to improve safety in congested traffic roads.

Rolling stock

As of 2016, KAI operates:
 420 locomotive units;
 578 electric multiple units;
 121 diesel multiple units;
 1,607 passenger coaches; and
 6,782 freight cars
The company is a major customer of the local railway equipment industry, PT Industri Kereta Api, using passenger coaches, freight wagons and electric multiple units made by the Madiun-based company.

KAIs' diesel-electric locomotives are mostly made in United States or Canada, while the diesel hydraulics are mostly German. Electric multiple units are mostly Japanese-built. Local industry is capable of building multiple units, both diesel and electric.

Locomotives
All locomotives of the KAI (with the exception of Steam locomotives for railway tours in Ambarawa) are diesel-engined. Most new locomotives use diesel-electric transmission, while older and lighter ones have hydraulic transmission. More than 400 locomotives (see below) are documented, but the actual number of operational locomotives is smaller. A recent source mentioned that the company have had 409 units of diesel locomotives. The oldest diesel locomotive in the system dates from 1953.

Based on Minister of Transportation's Regulation No. 45 of 2010, all of locomotives are required to use a combination of letters and numbers. A letter or a combination of letters is used to denote the wheel arrangement (currently there are C, D, BB and CC types), and a three-digit number is used to denote the class (2xx for classes with electric transmission and 3xx for classes with hydraulic or mechanical transmission), starting from 0. A two-digit number shows the year of operations, and two- or three-digit after the year shows the running number.

Examples
 CC 206 13 31: The 7th generation of diesel-electric Co'Co' locomotives, has operated since 2013, and have a running number 31.
 CC 201 77 01R: The 2nd generation of diesel-electric Co'Co' locomotives, has operated since 1977, and have a running number 01 and has been repowered.
 BB 304 84 07R: The 5th generation of diesel-hydraulic B'B' locomotives, has operated since 1984, and have a running number 07 and has been repowered.

The steam locomotive classification was directly derived from Japanese practice. Tank locomotives were numbered from the 10s, while tender locomotives from the 50s. Letter combinations were used for articulated locomotives (in the case of Indonesia these were Mallets).

Electric locomotives in Indonesia had always been a minority, and no new electric locomotives had been acquired in the last 70 years. However, electric multiple units have been imported from Japan and elsewhere since 1976. These are operated by the Jabotabek commuter urban transport division of the KAI, which has been spun off in August 2008.

May 2011: After changing the rail between Purwosari station and Wonogiri station and also the bridges with R42 (37 kilometres), so line between Sangkrah station, Solo and Wonogiri will be served by heavy electric diesel locomotives.

KAI diesel locomotive classes

 
 
 
 
 BB200
 BB201
 BB202
 
 
 
 
 
 
 
 
 
 
 CC201
 CC202
 CC203
 
 CC205
 CC206
 CC300

Named passenger trains

KAI runs three classes of named passenger trains on Java: Executive class (class 1), Business class (class 2), and Economy class (class 3).

Exclusive wagon
The "exclusive wagon" is a luxury train car rentable for a certain route, and attached to a regular train. Exclusive wagons are also known as kereta wisata ("tourist wagon"). The main users of these exclusive wagons are the president, vice-president, corporate boards, big extended families, and groups of artists or tourists. All cars can accommodate 22 passengers, and only 19 passengers for Nusantara cars with a queen bed. Snacks, meals and drinks are provided for free. KAI recommends advanced booking with payment due to high demand.

Disability wagons
On 18 October 2014, KAI launched the Jayabaya train with route Pasar Senen-Surabaya-Malang and back. The train contains two disability wagons, which include toilets for disabled persons, wide doors and spacious areas for wheelchairs. It will be implemented on other trains gradually.

Cargo
To anticipate a steady number of passengers, KAI has boosted cargo deliveries. On 3 May 2011 the company trialed the line from Cikarang Dry Port to Surabaya.

KAI and Danone Indonesia have made an agreement to carry Danone's water in 2013 to Jakarta. KAI will replace the track from R33 to R54 between Cicurug and Sukabumi with length 20 kilometres, spending Rp2 trillion ($222 million). One cargo train can replace 40 to 60 trucks. In addition, the company serves trains of coal in South Sumatra.

The government has tasked KAI with connecting Cikarang Dry Port and Tanjung Priok Port to ease heavy traffic between two locations. Construction began in early 2015. Trucks and flatbeds can only run 1.5 trip per day, while a train can carry 40 TEUs (Twenty-foot Equivalent Units) per trip.

Library wagon
To popularise their business, KAI launched the library wagon (Kereta Pustaka Indonesia) which displays documented company activities, small size assets and books. The library wagon staff holds an exhibition for one week in one station and then moves to other station.

Depot and facilities

In Java, KAI located its main diesel workshop in Pengok, Special Region of Yogyakarta for maintenance of both diesel electric and diesel hydraulic locomotives. The separate systems in Sumatra have their shops in Lahat Regency (South Sumatra), Padang (West Sumatra) and Pulubrayan (North Sumatra).

Other maintenance facilities are present in Manggarai (Jakarta), Tegal (Central Java) and Gubeng (Surabaya, East Java). These are used to repair coaches and wagons.

A large stabling point and maintenance facilities for electric rail cars has been constructed in Depok, West Java.

Motive power depots are located in Medan, Tebing Tinggi, Padang, Padang Panjang, Kertapati, Tanjungkarang, Rangkasbitung, Tanahabang (Jakarta), Cipinang (Jakarta), Bandung, Banjar, Cibatu, Cirebon, Purwokerto, Cilacap, Kutoarjo, Semarang Poncol, Yogyakarta, Solo Balapan, Cepu, Madiun, Sidotopo (Surabaya), and Jember.

Large areas in front of Purwakarta station (formerly a motive power depot) have been used for scrapping of the unused economy class electric multiple units since 2013.

Safety and Security
Polsuska (Indonesian: Polisi Khusus Kereta Api or Railroad Special Police) is a law enforcement unit under the auspices of the KAI. Polsuska in its role as a special railroad police is tasked with: applying sanctions in accordance with legislation and implement security, preventing crime, and preventing non-judicial actions within the scope of the Indonesian railways as a partner of the national police. Polsuska has responsibilities relating to law and order including security of railway stations and train users. Polsuska officers wear black as their uniform and wear orange berets pulled to the left. Polsuska is trained by but not part of the Indonesian National Police. Polsuska is under the command of the Indonesian Railway Company's Directorate of Safety and Security.

The Commuter Lines which serve Greater Jakarta maintain their own security force who are categorized as security guards. Their service uniforms are dark blue and they wear white helmets (or peaked caps) and are known as (Petugas Keamanan Dalam/PKD). These are not part of Polsuska.

Every railway station in Indonesia also operates several security guards to assist Polsuska in the field of law and order including security. During peak seasons such as during the last days of Ramadan and other national holidays, Polsuska may be assisted by members from the armed forces and police to provide an additional security presence within the KAI system.

Legislation
Railway operations in Indonesia were formerly regulated by the Act No. 13 of 1992 on Railways. This legislation stated that the government operates railways (arts. 4 and 6), delegates operations to an operating body [then the Perumka, later PT Kereta Api] (art. 6) and provides and maintains railway infrastructure (art. 8). Private companies are allowed to co-operate in operation of railways (art. 6).

In 25 April 2007, the new regulation, Act No. 23 of 2007 took effect. There were some changes in railway operators. In this law, track maintenance is more directly handled by the government (via the Directorate General of Railways, under the Ministry of Transportation). This is expected to improve the railway's position vis-à-vis other transportation modes.

The People's Representative Council has finished an amendment to the current legislation, to allow a greater role for private companies and regional governments in providing railway services. However, as yet there are no private operators of railway services.

Joint operation
In December 2011, a memorandum of understanding was signed between KAI and Bombardier Transportation, related to final assembly of diesel-electric TRAXX Asia Locomotives in Surabaya, East Java. Assembly began in early 2012 for exports to the Southeast Asia market, including for Indonesian Railways itself.

In early March 2012, KAI and GE Transportation announced the signing of a Memorandum of Understanding about train services and co-operation. All services are done in Indonesia by Indonesian workers. GE runs a traction motor remanufacturing center to serve all ASEAN countries.

Heritage sites
In 2012, Indonesian Railways allocated Rp20 billion ($2.2 million) to restore and renovate 20 heritage sites from at least 260 (680 in the future) heritage sites and historical railways on the islands of Java and Sumatra. One of them is Lawang Sewu in Semarang which attracted many tourists, and brought in Rp.1.5 billion ($0.17 million) from ticket revenues each year.

Subsidiaries 
The Railway Employee Welfare Center Foundation (Yayasan Pusaka), one of PNKA's foundations, established a company called PT Karya Pusaka which was founded on 5 December 1967 and changed its name to PT Pusaka Nusantara on 18 April 1970. Pusaka focuses on restoration companies, outsourcing, and cleanliness of train infrastructure and facilities.

This company focuses on business services to support railroad operations, such as restoration, parking, cleanliness on the train, restaurants and cafes, train washing, and comfort support. The company was formed on 2 July 2003. Reska is also the owner of the trademark Loko, a restaurant chain with the theme of rail transportation which has opened many outlets around the station.

On 12 August 2008, PT Kereta Api separated its Jabotabek Urban Transport Division,
which managing electrified commuter service in Jakarta metropolitan area (currently KRL Commuterline) into a subsidiary under the name PT KAI Commuter Jabodetabek (KCJ). In connection with the expansion plan, PT KCJ officially changed its name to PT Kereta Commuter Indonesia (KCI) as of 20 September 2017. Thus, commuter train services will no longer only focus on the Jabodetabek area.

On 8 September 2009, three subsidiary companies were formed: Kereta Api Pariwisata (branded as KA Wisata, formerly IndoRailTour) rail tourism services, the KA Properti Manajemen (KAPM) property management, and Kereta Api Logistik (Kalog) logistics company. KAI also formed a joint venture with Angkasa Pura II to operate an airport train service, which was then given the name . Railink was founded on 28 September 2006,  but only began operations in 2013 by launching the Kualanamu Airport Rail Link train.

Pursuant to Indonesia's "two shareholder minimum" on limited companies, Yayasan Pusaka owns less than one percent of shares in all of KAI's consolidated subsidiaries except KAI Bandara and PSBI/KCIC.

See also

 KA Commuter Jabodetabek
 Polsuska
 Persatuan Buruh Kereta Api
 Rail transport in Indonesia

References

External links

  
  

Railway companies of Indonesia
Government-owned companies of Indonesia
Government-owned railway companies
Public transport in Indonesia
Railway companies established in 1945
1945 establishments in Indonesia
Companies based in Bandung
3 ft 6 in gauge railways in Indonesia
Standard gauge railways in Indonesia